Extraordinary You is a 2019 South Korean television series starring Kim Hye-yoon, Rowoon, Lee Jae-wook, Lee Na-eun, Jung Gun-joo, Kim Young-dae, and Lee Tae-ri. It is based on the webtoon July Found by Chance which was first published in January 2018 on Daum Webtoon. The series aired on MBC TV's Wednesdays and Thursdays 21:00 (KST) time slot from October 2 to November 21, 2019.

Synopsis
The series follows high school girl Eun Dan-oh (Kim Hye-yoon) who is a student at a prestigious academy. One day, by chance, she discovers that the world she lives in is a fantasy world of comics. She and everyone else are merely characters in a comic book entitled Secret, all under the authority of their omnipotent and omniscient Writer. Dan-oh is only an extra character and, worse, the Writer gave her a lame set-up: she is engaged to her long-time crush who despises her, and she has a heart disease and is expected to die soon.

Not satisfied with this fate, Dan-oh decides to forge her own destiny by changing the story's plot and finding her own true love. Her hopes of freeing herself from the Writer's control becomes stronger than before when she unexpectedly meets nameless Student Number 13 (Rowoon). But as the events around Dan-oh and Number 13, whom she named as Haru, gradually start to have parallels with the Writer's previous work Neungsohwa, changing her destiny could have a price to pay.

Cast

Main
 Kim Hye-yoon as Eun Dan-oh (Secret and Neungsohwa)
 A student of Class 2-7 in Seuli High School; an extra character in Secret and the female main character of Neungsohwa. Dan-oh is the beautiful and only daughter of a wealthy family who still has a heart disease despite having been operated on multiple times. After sensing weird things happening to her, Dan-oh finds out that she and everyone else around her live in a fantasy world inside a teen fiction comic book entitled Secret, of which she is only an extra character. As a character in Secret, she is engaged to Kyung, her crush for almost a decade, and could possibly die soon due to her health condition.
 Dan-oh was also a main character in one of the Writer's previous works, the period romance comic book Neungsohwa, which is set in the Goryeo era. In Neungsohwa, she is Lady Eun Dan-oh, a noble maiden betrothed to Prince Baek Kyung.
 Rowoon as Number 13 / Ha-ru (Secret and Neungsohwa)
 A student of Class 2-7 in Seuli High School; an extra character in Secret and one of the male main characters of Neungsohwa. Ha-ru is a handsome student that Dan-oh starts noticing and liking after he saves her multiple times, helping Dan-oh in changing her fate. He is a nameless extra in Secret that even other characters are not aware of his existence. Being the 13th student in the class roster, Dan-oh calls him Number 13 at first. Later on, Dan-oh names him Ha-ru which, seemingly like a coincidence, was also his name in his former role in Neungsohwa. He has been aware that he is a character in a comic book.
 Ha-ru was a main character in Neungsohwa as a warrior and Prince Baek Kyung's personal guard.
 Lee Jae-wook as Baek Kyung (Secret and Neungsohwa)
 A student of Class 2-7 in Seuli High School; a supporting character in Secret and one of the male main characters of Neungsohwa. Kyung is a rude and arrogant student who has an abusive father and a greedy stepmother. He is a member of the A3, a trio of the most handsome and powerful boys in their school. He is engaged to Dan-oh, whom he dislikes due to circumstances around their arranged marriage. After observing Dan-oh, Ha-ru, and Do-hwa's strange behavior, he starts becoming aware that he is a character in a comic book, and slowly realises that he actually likes Dan-oh, as driven by his jealousy towards her close relationship with Ha-ru.
 He was also a main character in Neungsohwa as Prince Baek Kyung, the brother of King Geum Jin-mi and Lady Eun's fiancé.
 Lee Na-eun as Yeo Joo-da (Secret)
 A student of Class 2-7 in Seuli High School; the female main character of Secret. Joo-da is a beautiful student who comes from a poor family but is optimistic despite being bullied and has a kind heart. She senses strange things around her and eventually realizes that she is the protagonist in a comic book but keeps it a secret.
 Jung Gun-joo as Lee Do-hwa (Secret)
 A student of Class 2-8 in Seuli High School and the second male main character of Secret. A member of the A3, Do-hwa is a friendly student, appeared to be cold and cool, who is skilled in music and hides his loneliness and sadness behind his bright smile. He secretly harbors feelings for Joo-da and is in a love triangle with A3 leader Nam-joo. Like Dan-oh, he senses strange things happening to him and later learns from Dan-oh about his existence as a character in a comic book.
 Kim Young-dae as Oh Nam-joo (Secret)
 A student of Class 2-7 in Seuli High School and the male main character of Secret. Nam-joo is a second-generation chaebol, and the leader of A3. He also has feelings for Joo-da and is entangled in a love triangle with A3 member Do-hwa.
 Lee Tae-ri as Jinmichae (Secret) / Geum Jin-mi (Neungsohwa)
 A cafeteria cook in Seuli High School; an extra character in Secret and supporting character in Neungsohwa. Handsome yet mysterious, Jinmichae is nicknamed Dried Squid Fairy by adoring female students. He seems to know more about the world of comics than anyone else.
 He was a supporting character in Neungsohwa where he started to become aware of his existence as a comic book character while playing the role of King Geum Jin-mi.

Supporting

Seuli High School
Note: The following characters are part of the world of the comic book Secret unless indicated otherwise.

 Kim Ji-in as Shin Sae-mi
A student of Class 2-7 in Seuli High School; Dan-oh and Soo-chul's close friend. She harbors a long-time crush for Nam-joo and bullies Joo-da for being Nam-joo's love interest despite her low status. She used to have a crush on Nam-joo but starts falling for her best friend Soo-chul.
 Kim Hyun-mok as Ahn Soo-chul
A student of Class 2-7 in Seuli High School; Dan-oh and Sae-mi's close friend. He is a web vlogger who wishes to have millions of subscribers.
  as Kim Il-jin
A student of Class 2-7 in Seuli High School; one of the three girl bullies who harass Joo-da with Sae-mi. One of Nam-joo's admirers.
 Jung Mi-mi as Park Yi-jin
A student of Class 2-7 in Seuli High School; one of the three girl bullies who harass Joo-da with Sae-mi. One of Nam-joo's admirers.
 Jung Ye-jin as Lee Sam-jin
A student of Class 2-7 in Seuli High School; one of the three girl bullies who harass Joo-da with Sae-mi. One of Nam-joo's admirers.
 Han Chae-kyung as Kim Ae-il
A student of Class 2-7 in Seuli High School; one of Kyung's admirers
  as Park Ae-ri
A student of Class 2-7 in Seuli High School; one of Kyung's admirers
 Kang Min-ji as Lee Ae-sam
A student of Class 2-7 in Seuli High School; one of Kyung's admirers
 Jung Dae-ro as Kim Yang-il
A student of Class 2-7 in Seuli High School; one of the three boy bullies, who sometimes call themselves "Y3" when the A3 is not around.
 Lee Wo-je as Park Yang-yi
A student of Class 2-7 in Seuli High School; one of the three boy bullies
  as Lee Yang-sam
A student of Class 2-7 in Seuli High School; one of the three boy bullies
 Jo Deok-hee as Kim Ban-jang
A student of Class 2-7 in Seuli High School; the class president.
 Oh Jong-min as Kim Bo-tong
A student of Class 2-7 in Seuli High School; a guy with ordinary face and personality and average grades
 Kim Joon-sung as Park Mo-bum
 A student of Class 2-7 in Seuli High School; the class nerd and model student
 Shin Yong-ho as Shin Ba-ram
A student of Class 2-7 in Seuli High School.
 Han Myung-hwan as Kang Chul-nam
A student of Class 2-7 in Seuli High School.
 Jung Ji-hyun as Han Soo-da
A student of Class 2-7 in Seuli High School.
 Lee Eun-hye as Kong Joo-hae
A student of Class 2-7 in Seuli High School.
 Heo Soo-bin as Wang Bit-na
A student of Class 2-7 in Seuli High School.
 Pyo Hyun-jin as Namgoong Dan-bal
A student of Class 2-7 in Seuli High School.
 Kim Tae-jung as Chae Yook-in
A student of Class 2-7 in Seuli High School.
 Kim Jung-hak as homeroom teacher
 Kim Jae-hwa as art teacher
 Lee Ye-hyun as Kim Soo-hyang
A transfer student of Class 2-8 in Seuli High School (Secret); King Geum Jin-mi's love interest  (Neungsohwa)
 Bae Hyun-sung as Baek Joon-hyun
 A student in Seuli High School; Kyung's self-aware half-brother who remembers the past (Secret) / son of Lord Baek (Neungsohwa)

Others
 Um Hyo-sup as Eun Moo-young
 Dan-oh's loving and caring father (Secret and Neungsohwa)
 Choi Jin-ho as Baek Dae-sung
 Kyung's abusive and uncaring father (Secret) / a court official and Joon-hyun's father (Neungsohwa)
 Yoon Jong-hoon as Dr. Lee Jo-hwa
 A cardiothoracic surgeon; Do-hwa's brother and Dan-oh's physician (Secret)
 Yu Ji-soo as Ra Hye-young
 Kyung's stepmother (Secret)
 Yu Ha-bok as Oh Jae-beol
 Nam-joo's father (Secret)
 Ji Soo-won as Cha Ji-hyun
 Nam-joo's mother (Secret) / Queen Dowager and mother of King Geum Jin-mi (Neungsohwa)

Episodes

Production
The series was tentatively titled as July Found by Chance, the same title as the webtoon which it was based on.

The series was first scheduled to premiere in September 2019 but was pushed back to October 2.

Original soundtrack

Extraordinary You: Original Soundtrack
The drama's soundtrack is compiled in a three-part album released by labels VLENDING and MusicBuddy on 20 November 2019. CD 1 contains the drama's theme songs and their instrumental versions, CDs 2 and 3 contain the drama's musical score.

Singles 
The following is the track list of singles from Extraordinary You: Original Soundtrack.

Part 1

Part 2

Part 3

Part 4

Part 5

Part 6

Part 7

Part 8

Ratings

Awards and nominations

Notes

References

External links
  
 
 
 July Found by Chance at Daum Webtoon 

MBC TV television dramas
Korean-language television shows
2019 South Korean television series debuts
2019 South Korean television series endings
South Korean fantasy television series
South Korean romance television series
South Korean high school television series
Television shows based on South Korean webtoons
Television series by RaemongRaein
Television series about teenagers